Zamaanat is a 1977 Indian Hindi-language action film, produced by V. K. Sobti under the Gautam Pictures banner and directed by A. Salaam. It stars Jeetendra, Reena Roy, Amjad Khan, Bindu in lead roles and music composed by Sonik Omi.

Plot
It's the story of two brothers and their lives full of deceit and in-fights against their own tribe and the police. During the flow of life, the brothers get separated and both become known for their vocation -one as a dacoit and the other as a Policeman. They come to kill each other, but learn in time that they are brothers.

Cast
Jeetendra as Ravi 
Reena Roy as Reshma
Amjad Khan as Ranveer / Rana
Bindu as Rani
Sujit Kumar as Rocky
Ranjeet as Mangal 
Om Shivpuri as Rustam
Yunus Parvez as Police Commissioner
Mukri as Kalua
Krishan Dhawan as John 
Chand Usmani as Parvati

Soundtrack

References

External links
 

1970s Hindi-language films
1977 films
1977 action films
Films scored by Sonik-Omi
Indian action films
Hindi-language action films